Backobourkia brouni,, or Broun's marbled orb-weaver, also often referred to by its synonym Backobourkia brounii, is a spider native to Australia and New Zealand.

References

Araneidae
Spiders of Australia
Spiders of New Zealand